Sharga River is a river in Khövsgöl aimag of northern Mongolia. It runs through the eastern part of "East Taiga", the north eastern extension of the Darkhad valley. The river starts as a confluence of several smaller rivers in the Tsagaannuur sum near the Russian border and exits into Dood Tsagaan Lake in the Renchinlkhümbe sum as a tributary of the Little Yenisey (Shishged Gol).

References

See also 
List of rivers of Mongolia

Rivers of Mongolia